Effigy is a DC Comics supervillain who fought against Green Lantern Kyle Rayner using flame powers he gained from the Controllers.

Origins 
Raised in Seattle, Washington, by his alcoholic father after his mother had died, Martyn Van Wyck was a bitter and resentful man. Constantly in conflict with authority figures, he aspired to a career as a musician, but could not obtain even menial work in the music industry.

Outside Seattle, Van Wyck was abducted by aliens: Controllers, an alien race that had originated on Maltus and had split from the Guardians of the Universe some three billion years ago. Van Wyck only retained vague memories of being in a room with figures standing over him. Six days later, Van Wyck was found in the middle of the road, naked and confused. He was taken to the nearest emergency room, where the doctors found nothing wrong with him except that his eyes had changed from blue to a flame-like flickering orange.

Meeting with his friends, Van Wyck told them all he knew about his condition. When the owner of the coffee shop they were sitting in asked them to leave, Van Wyck responded with a beast made out of flame. He realized he could do anything he wanted with his newfound powers. Outside the coffee shop, an argument with a driver was quickly won by Van Wyck when he torched the man's car. In his anger, Van Wyck had transformed. His skin had turned white, while his hair turned to flame and he was dressed in a red costume. He also found that he was able to fly. It was later revealed the Controllers were attempting to create superhuman beings to replace their Darkstars.

Talking with his girlfriend, Trace, Van Wyck explained how he was sick of being "pushed around" by others and things would change now that he had powers. Trace described the images he made in the flames as burning effigies, an image or copy. Van Wyck liked the word, and took the name Effigy. He decided to leave Seattle and Trace behind. As far as he was concerned, his life as Martyn Van Wyck was over; he was now only Effigy.

Van Wyck traveled to Hollywood, California, where he promptly set out to get attention by causing destruction, just because he could. Burning the famous "Hollywood" sign caught the attention of the media, which in turn caught the attention of Green Lantern Kyle Rayner. Effigy relished the chance to take on a member of the Justice League and quickly attacked.

Effigy and Green Lantern battled across Hollywood and down to the coastline. Finally, it appeared Green Lantern had overcome the new villain. Suddenly, a bright light appeared above the two combatants. It was the Controllers and they had returned to reclaim Effigy. They had released him thinking their experiments were a failure. Green Lantern attempted to stop them from taking Van Wyck but they were too powerful for the ring wielder. Effigy was taken aboard the ship, which left Earth. Inside, the Controllers continued their experimentation, simply because they could.

Pawn of the Controllers 
Rayner next encountered Effigy on his way to confront the Controllers about their psychic tampering with his mind. Before Rayner could enter their ship, The Controllers dispatched Effigy, whom they had apparently made into their obedient servant but in doing so had removed much of his individuality, rendering him a nearly mindless drone. Effigy, sans imagination and willpower, was no match for a Green Lantern, and Rayner easily defeated him. Rayner left Effigy drifting in space while he dealt with the Controllers, reasoning that Effigy's powers would protect him.

Return to Earth 
Effigy somehow made his way back to Earth, where he had a brief affair/adventure with the second Killer Frost. During this time, they attracted the attention again of Green Lantern Kyle Rayner, whom the new couple quickly immobilized. Afterwards, Killer Frost began to lecture Effigy on his poor performance, and insisted that during battle he defer to her expertise and experience when dealing with superheroes. Effigy took offense to this and began to have second thoughts about their relationship.

Rayner eventually caught up with Effigy and Killer Frost. This time, however, he buried Killer Frost under a mountain of ice she had created, thus interrupting her heat absorbing powers. Effigy was about to dig her out when suddenly he decided to save himself and ditch Killer Frost. He ignited a passing car to distract the Green Lantern and flew away thinking "the only thing worse than a know-it-all superhero is a know-it-all supervillain".

Breakdown 
Prior to Kyle Rayner's transformation to Ion, Effigy was discovered by Jade, having apparently suffered a psychotic breakdown. His schizophrenia had manifested through his powers, with the creation of three independent pyrokinetic characters calling themselves Torch, Blaze and Ember. Jade and Rayner defeated the three aspects and Effigy agreed to return to prison.

Afterward, he was not seen until appearing among the ranks of the Society, working with other fiery villains such as Heat Wave.

One Year Later 
One Year Later, Effigy was once again set against Kyle Rayner (going again by the name of Ion) by a mysterious enemy, bent on the Guardians' destruction, after the failure of Alex Nero. Defeated, he was unable to remember the name of his contractor, his orders having been given in a subliminal way and later expunged from his mind.

On the cover of Justice League of America #13 (vol. 2), it shows Effigy as a member of the new Injustice League.

Effigy is also one of the exiled villains featured in Salvation Run.

In Final Crisis #1 he can be seen as the member of Libra's Secret Society of Super Villains, where he aided in the death of the Martian Manhunter. In Final Crisis: Revelations #1, Effigy is killed by the Spectre, who melts him into lamp oil, yet still keeping him consciously alive, and places him in a lantern resembling a Green Lantern ring's power battery where he then burns him to death.

Powers and abilities 

Effigy could create flame-based constructs including battle-armor, weaponry, fiery creatures, and anything else he could imagine. His powers allowed him to fly, fire flame blasts, and could apparently protect him from the vacuum of space.

His powers had several advantages and disadvantages compared to the rings wielded by members of the Green Lantern Corps. He did not need to recharge his powers and he could affect any substance (although he himself was vulnerable to water). In contrast, he could not translate other languages, search for energy signatures, manipulate sub-atomic particles, or have access to a database from which to draw information. Also, he did not possess the raw willpower and focus that Green Lanterns do and could be easily distracted.

References

The Book of OA: Effigy

DC Comics supervillains
DC Comics metahumans
Fictional characters with fire or heat abilities
Fictional characters from Seattle
Comics characters introduced in 1999
Characters created by Ron Marz